Timyra is a genus of moths in the family Lecithoceridae.

Species
 Timyra aeolocoma Meyrick, 1939
 Timyra alloptila Meyrick, 1916
 Timyra antichira Wu & Park, 1999
 Timyra aulonitis Meyrick, 1908
 Timyra autarcha Meyrick, 1908
 Timyra caulisivena Wu & Park, 1999
 Timyra cicinnota Meyrick, 1916
 Timyra cingalensis Walsingham, [1886]
 Timyra citrinodema Wu & Park, 1999
 Timyra crassella (Felder & Rogenhofer, 1875)
 Timyra dipsalea Meyrick, 1908
 Timyra extranea Walsingham, 1891
 Timyra floccula Bradley, 1965
 Timyra irrorella (Walsingham, [1886])
 Timyra lecticaria Meyrick, 1916
 Timyra machlas Meyrick, 1905
 Timyra marmaritis Meyrick, 1906
 Timyra metallanthes Meyrick, 1905
 Timyra oculinota Wu & Park, 1999
 Timyra orthadia Meyrick, 1906
 Timyra parochra Meyrick, 1906
 Timyra pastas Meyrick, 1908
 Timyra peronetris Meyrick, 1906
 Timyra phorcis Meyrick, 1908
 Timyra phycisella Walker, 1864
 Timyra praeceptrix Meyrick, 1910
 Timyra pristica Meyrick, 1916
 Timyra schoenota Meyrick, 1908
 Timyra selmatias Meyrick, 1908
 Timyra stachyophora Meyrick, 1908
 Timyra stasiotica Meyrick, 1908
 Timyra stenomacra Wu & Park, 1999
 Timyra temenodes Meyrick, 1922
 Timyra tinctella (Walsingham, [1886])
 Timyra toxastis Meyrick, 1908
 Timyra xanthaula Meyrick, 1908

References

Natural History Museum Lepidoptera genus database

 
Lecithocerinae
Moth genera